Casperson is an unincorporated community in Roseau County, in the U.S. state of Minnesota.

History
A post office called Casperson was established in 1903, and remained in operation until 1917. The community was named for two brothers who settled near the original town site.

References

Unincorporated communities in Roseau County, Minnesota
Unincorporated communities in Minnesota